Athletes from the Netherlands competed at the 1960 Winter Olympics in Squaw Valley, United States.

Medalists

Figure skating

Speed skating

Men

References
Official Olympic Reports
International Olympic Committee results database
Olympic Winter Games 1960, full results by sports-reference.com

Nations at the 1960 Winter Olympics
1960
Olympics